Marcos Rodriguez may refer to:

 Marcos A. Rodriguez (born 1958), Cuban-American entrepreneur and producer
 Marcos Rodriguez, a member of the Spanish DJ and singing duo Magan & Rodriguez
 Marcos Rodriguez Ema, Puerto Rican Chief of Staff
 Marcos Rodríguez Pantoja (born 1946), feral child

See also
 Rodriguez (disambiguation)
 Marco Rodríguez (disambiguation)
 Marcos (given name)